"There Is a Tavern in the Town" is a traditional folk song, which first appeared in the 1883 edition of William H. Hill's Student Songs. The song was the college anthem of Trinity University College. 

It was famously performed by Rudy Vallée as "The Drunkard Song", slightly changing the chorus. While recording the last verses of the song, Vallée started to laugh uncontrollably given the antiquated lyrics. He and his band recorded the song again without laughing, but Victor released both takes in 1934. He also performs the song in the film Sweet Music.

There have also been recordings by Gracie Fields (c.1938) and Wally Cox. 

Bing Crosby included the song in a medley on his album 101 Gang Songs (1961) and Nat King Cole performed a cover of the song on his album Those Lazy-Hazy-Crazy Days of Summer (1963).
It also featured in the English WW2 Leslie Howard movie, "Pimpernel" Smith, as the code tune to indicate the pimpernel's presence.

The catchy tune of the song is more recognized and used in the popular children's song, "Head, Shoulders, Knees and Toes".

While the song is usually performed up-tempo, a balladic version appeared in the Ripper Street third season episode "Ashes and Diamonds", arranged for Charlene McKenna as the character Rose Erskine on BBC One and Amazon Prime Instant Video.

During the bar scene in Captain America: The First Avenger, the song is played on the piano.

Lyrics
There is a tavern in the town, in the town
And there my true love sits him down, sits him down,
And drinks his wine as merry as can be,
And never, never thinks of me.

Chorus: Fare thee well, for I must leave thee,
Do not let this parting grieve thee,
And remember that the best of friends
Must part, must part.

Adieu, adieu kind friends, adieu, adieu, adieu,
I can no longer stay with you, stay with you,
I will hang my harp on the weeping willow tree,
And may the world go well with thee.

He left me for a damsel dark, damsel dark,
Each Friday night they used to spark, used to spark,
And now my love who once was true to me
Takes this dark damsel on his knee.

And now I see him nevermore, nevermore;
He never knocks upon my door, on my door;
Oh, woe is me; he pinned a little note,
And these were all the words he wrote:

Oh, dig my grave both wide and deep, wide and deep;
Put tombstones at my head and feet, head and feet
And on my breast you may carve a turtle dove,
To signify I died of love.

Note: The Hill version has "And on my breast carve a turtle dove"
The penultimate verse does not appear in this oldest published version.

The lyrics share similarity to English folk ballad "Fare The Well," including the repeated phrase and imagery of a turtledove.

See also 
Head, Shoulders, Knees and Toes – a children's song sung to the same tune

References 

American folk songs
Songs about parting
Songs about death
1883 songs
Songwriter unknown